Hugh Watkins may refer to:

Hugh Watkins (referee) (born 1963), Welsh rugby referee
Hugh Christian Watkins (born 1959), English cardiologist and professor